Poley Mountain is located 10 km outside of Sussex, New Brunswick, Canada. Poley Mountain is a known ski resort in southern New Brunswick. The town is centrally located between New Brunswick's three major cities: Moncton, Saint John, and the capital city of Fredericton. Poley Mountain is a destination for skiers from the southern portion of New Brunswick.

The mountain has had many upgrades over the last decade under the direction of a group of local shareholders. The shareholders were able to prevent the sale of the mountain's lift system by purchasing the assets of the mountain in the late 1990s. The mountain has been operational every season since the purchase and averages about 100 operating days every season.

In the summer–fall of 2008 the Alpine Lift (fixed grip triple) was installed which gives access to six new beginner and intermediate trails on the west side of the mountain including a new gladed run, Sous-Bois Shediac, created in the fall of 2009. The t-bar lift which used to run parallel to the Chute has been removed and will now become a mogul run for advanced skiers. The addition of the Alpine Lift resulted in Poley becoming the mountain with the greatest uphill capacity in the Maritimes.

Poley is often compared to Ski Wentworth near Truro, NS and Crabbe Mountain north of Fredericton, NB as these are the two mountains closest in proximity to Poley. All three ski areas share similar characteristics in terms of skiable terrain and elevation.

On December 9, 2014, the main lodge of Poley, a New Brunswick icon, was burnt to the ground, as fire crews responded and were finally able to control the blaze later. Early estimates of the damage reports in the $17 million plus range. Brian Gallant, New Brunswick Premier, made a Tweet about the incident, "Saddened to see the loss of the iconic Poley Mountain lodge this evening, a true loss to N.B.,"

See also
List of ski areas and resorts in Canada

References

External links 
 Poley Mountain home page
 CBC Article re: Fire
 Brian Gallant Tweet re: Fire

Geography of Kings County, New Brunswick
Ski areas and resorts in New Brunswick
Mountains of New Brunswick
Tourist attractions in Kings County, New Brunswick
Mountains of Canada under 1000 metres